The northern giant petrel (Macronectes halli), also known as Hall's giant petrel, is a large predatory seabird of the southern oceans. Its distribution overlaps broadly, but is slightly north of,  the similar southern giant petrel (Macronectes giganteus).

Taxonomy
The northern giant petrel was formally described in 1912 by the Australian born ornithologist Gregory Mathews as a subspecies of the southern giant petrel with the trinomial name Macronectes giganteus halli. The specific epithet halli was chosen to honour the Australian ornithologist Robert Hall who had described the birds breeding on the Kerguelen Islands. The northern giant petrel is now considered to be a separate species and has the binomial name Macronectes halli. It is monotypic: no subspecies are recognised. The genus name combines the Ancient Greek makros meaning "great" and nēktēs meaning "swimmer". The name "petrel" refers to the Biblical account of Saint Peter walking on water, referring to the way these birds run on top of the water as they are getting airborne.

The two giant petrel species make up the genus Macronectes. They belong to the order Procellariiformes, the tube-nosed seabirds or petrels. All tube-noses have tubular nostrils, and all those in the family Procellariidae, the true petrels, have their nostrils united along the top of the bill. Procellariform birds have between seven and nine distinct horny plates for their bill, and in petrels one of these plates forms the hooked portion of their upper bill called the maxillary unguis. They produce a stomach oil made up of wax esters and triglycerides that is stored in the proventriculus. This can be sprayed out of their mouths as a defence against predators as well as an energy rich food source for chicks and for the adults during their long flights. Finally, they also have a salt gland that is situated above the nasal passage and helps desalinate their bodies, due to the high amount of sea water that they imbibe. It excretes a concentrated saline solution from their nostrils.

Description

Size is somewhat variable and this species is broadly the same size as its southern sister species. The largest-bodied colony is in the South Georgia Islands, where 56 males averaged  and 43 females average . The smallest-bodied are on the Chatham Islands, where 19 males averaged  and 21 females averaged . Its plumage consists of grey-brown body with lighter coloured forehead, sides of face, and chin. Its eyes are grey. The tarsus of the northern giant petrel is slightly longer on average than the southern species, but the southern has longer wings on average. The juvenile Macronectes halli is entirely dark brown and lightens as it ages. It can be differentiated from Macronectes giganteus by the top of the bill, which on the southern species is green.

Distribution and habitat
The northern giant petrel is pelagic and is found throughout the Southern Ocean north of the Antarctic Convergence Zone, and north through Chile, Argentina, South Africa, New Zealand, and half of Australia. Over 4,500 pairs nest on islands in the South Georgia group. They also nest on some of the Chatham Islands, Kerguelen Islands, Crozet Islands, Macquarie Island and others.

Behaviour

Feeding

The northern giant petrel feeds mainly on carrion (dead penguins and pinnipeds), as well as fish, krill, squid, and other cephalopods. They will follow fishing boats and cruise ships, eating any discarded fish and waste from the ships. During the breeding season, males eat more carrion than females, with the females feeding on pelagic sources. They are extremely aggressive and will kill other seabirds (mostly penguin chicks, sick or injured adult penguins and the chicks of other seabirds), even those as large as an albatross.

Northern giant petrels forage in similar locations to southern giant petrels, but at different times due to the earlier breeding season of northern giant petrels. It is thought this temporal segregation in habitat-use reduces interspecific competition, whilst sexual segregation, due to females making more pelagic trips than males, reduces intraspecific competition.

Breeding
Birds start breeding at an average age of ten years, and breed on islands in colonies, which they share with the southern giant petrel. They breed six weeks earlier than their counterparts.

Conservation

In a 2001 estimate, this species had between 17,000 and 21,000 mature birds. This number has been increasing over the last two decades, after being expected to decrease. The IUCN thus downgraded them from near threatened to least concern. Recent surveys have shown that most locations are increasing in numbers, except for the Crozet Islands. This is probably due to increases in fish waste, better control on longline fishing, and more carrion from fur seals.

Currently, this bird is listed on CMS Appendix II and ACAP Annex 1. Future plans are to maintain surveys and counting of individuals, research movement and migration, and continue lowering the bycatch deaths by current means and if needed newer measures through CCAMLR, CMS, and FAO.

References

Sources

External links 

Species factsheet by BirdLife International
Photos by Christopher Taylor Nature Photography
 Southern and Northern Giant Petrels - Species text in The Atlas of Southern African Birds.
 Northern giant petrel discussed in RNZ Critter of the Week, 7 July 2017

northern giant petrel
Birds of Uruguay
Birds of Patagonia
Birds of Southern Africa
Birds of New South Wales
Birds of South Australia
Birds of Victoria (Australia)
Birds of Western Australia
Birds of Tasmania
Birds of New Zealand
Birds of subantarctic islands
northern giant petrel